Feroz Sherif  is a former Indian professional footballer and current coach. He played as a goalkeeper for State Bank of Travancore and India.

Career
Born in Kochi, Kerala, Sherif spent some of his youth career with Santos Club. Sherif soon joined State Bank of Travancore where he played in local tournaments and the National Football League as well. In 2002, following State Bank of Travancore being relegated from the NFL, Sherif signed for Mahindra United on loan for the 2002–03 season.

Sherif also represented his state, Kerala, in the Santosh Trophy. He led the team to the final of the 2001–02 Santosh Trophy against Goa. Kerala won the tournament that year, defeating Goa in the final 3–2 through an Abdul Hakkim hat-trick.

International
Sherif has been called up and played for India during the 1997 Nehru Cup, 1998 Asian Games, and 1998 FIFA World Cup qualification.

Coaching
After retiring as a player, Sherif went into coaching. At one point, Sherif was coach of the Kerala under-13 side. Sheriff has also worked as a goalkeeper coach for the India U19 and India U16 sides.

Feroz is also credited for having coached and scouted India international, Anas Edathodika, in 2007.

Honours

Individual
G.V. Raja Award: 1997–98

References

External links 
 All India Football Federation Profile.

1971 births
Living people
Sportspeople from Kochi
Indian footballers
Mahindra United FC players
Association football goalkeepers
Footballers from Kerala
National Football League (India) players
India international footballers
Footballers at the 1998 Asian Games
Asian Games competitors for India